Connersville Township is one of nine townships in Fayette County, Indiana. As of the 2010 census, its population was 12,282 and it contained 5,573 housing units.

History
Connersville Township was organized in 1819 as one of five original townships of Fayette County containing the namesake town, which was designated the county seat.

John Conner is credited with being the first settler in Connersville Township. He established a trading post which was the center of early pioneer life.

Geography

Cities and towns
 Connersville (southwest half)

Unincorporated towns
 Longwood Crossing
 Tyner Crossing
(This list is based on USGS data and may include former settlements.)

Adjacent townships
 Harrison Township (north)
 Waterloo Township (northeast)
 Jennings Township (east)
 Jackson Township (southeast)
 Columbia Township (southwest)
 Orange Township (southwest)
 Fairview Township (northwest)

Major highways
 Indiana State Road 1
 Indiana State Road 44
 Indiana State Road 121

Cemeteries
The township contains one cemetery, Tullis Chapel.

References
 
 United States Census Bureau cartographic boundary files

External links
 Indiana Township Association
 United Township Association of Indiana

Townships in Fayette County, Indiana
Townships in Indiana